St. Peter's Episcopal Church may refer to:

 St. Peter's Episcopal Church (Seward, Alaska), listed on the NRHP in Alaska
 St. Peter's Episcopal Church (Milford, Connecticut)
 St. Peter's Episcopal Church (Lewes, Delaware)
 St. Peter's Episcopal Church (Sycamore, Illinois)
 St. Peter's Episcopal Church (Oxford, Mississippi), on National Register of Historic Places listings in Mississippi
 St. Peter's Episcopal Church (Harrisonville, Missouri)
 St. Peter's Episcopal Church (Neligh, Nebraska), on National Register of Historic Places listings in Nebraska
 St. Peter's Episcopal Church (Carson City, Nevada)
 St. Peter's Episcopal Church (Albany, New York)
 St. Peter's Episcopal Church Complex (Auburn, New York)
 St. Peter's Episcopal Church (Bloomfield, New York)
 St. Peter's Episcopal Church (Geneva, New York)
 St. Peter's Episcopal Church Complex (Hobart, New York)
 St. Peter's Episcopal Church (Manhattan), New York, founded in 1831
 St. Peter's Episcopal Church (Niagara Falls, New York), designed by Henry C. Dudley
 St. Peter's Episcopal Church (Peekskill, New York)
 St. Peter's Episcopal Church (Port Chester, New York)
 St. Peter's Episcopal Church (Clarksboro, New Jersey)
 St. Peter's Episcopal Church (Freehold Borough, New Jersey)
 St. Peter's Episcopal Church (Morristown, New Jersey)
 St. Peter's Episcopal Church (Perth Amboy, New Jersey)
 St. Peter's Episcopal Church (Philadelphia)
 St. Peter's Episcopal Church (Pittsburgh), Pennsylvania
 St. Peter's Episcopal Church (Columbia, Tennessee)
 St. Peter's Episcopal Church (McKinney, Texas)
 St. Peter's Episcopal Church (Norfolk, Virginia), listed on the NRHP in Norfolk, Virginia
 St. Peter's Episcopal Church (Oak Grove, Virginia)
 St. Peter's Episcopal Church (Tacoma, Washington), on National Register of Historic Places, Pierce County, Washington
 St. Peter's Episcopal Church (Ripon, Wisconsin)
 St. Peter's Episcopal Church (Sheridan, Wyoming)

See also
 St. Peter's Church (disambiguation)